The New Jersey Midland Railway was a 19th-century predecessor to the New York, Susquehanna and Western Railway (NYS&W) that operated in Northern New Jersey and Orange County, New York.

Formation and construction

The New Jersey Midland Railway can trace its roots back to the failed New Jersey, Hudson & Delaware Railroad (NJH&D), chartered in 1832 to connect industrial Paterson, New Jersey, east to the ports along the Hudson Waterfront opposite New York City at Hoboken and west to Pennsylvania at the Delaware Water Gap. Though the company did not construct any track, the charter remained active until 1870, and the company cleared a right of way from Sandyston to New York.

In the mid-1860s, several companies were formed to create railroads across northern New Jersey. The earliest of these, the Hoboken, Ridgefield and Paterson Railroad was chartered in 1866 to connect Paterson with the ports along the Hudson River waterfront; various logistical issues ensured this company would not build anything. More successful was the New Jersey Western Railroad, which had built about ten miles of trackage from Hawthorne/Hawthorne (NYS&W station) to Bloomingdale from 1868 to 1870, including the Wortendyke (NYS&W station) before it was consolidated into the NJ Midland.

The New Jersey Midland Railway (NJM) was formed in 1870 as a consolidation of several smaller railroads, including the NJH&D and the NJW. The original plan was to cut through the Hudson Palisades near Englewood and run south along the Hudson River to Weehawken, but the company lacked the money to do so, and instead made arrangements to run through the Pennsylvania Railroad's cut from Marion Junction through Bergen Hill in Jersey City to their Exchange Place Terminal.

In 1871 built west from Two Bridges/Beaver Lake through Sussex County, including construction of the Backwards Tunnel, to the New York state line at Hanford, New Jersey, just south of Unionville, New York. The Ogden Mine Railroad was made obsolete. This was later known as the Hanford Branch.

By 1872 the NJ Midland completed the line between Hackensack and Newfoundland. It also built a line through the Ridgefields by 1872, but with no station. It joined the Erie Railroad Northern Branch at Granton Junction near Babbit, and reached the community of New Durham (near the point now under New Jersey Route 495 where the Susquehanna Transfer had later been located).

Hudson Connecting Railway

The charter for the NJ Midland prevented it from crossing any other railroad to reach the Hudson River, but a route along the foot of the west side of the Bergen Hill to reach the PRR took it across the Erie Railroad. So a new company with the same management, the Hudson Connecting Railway, was formed to build the final leg. With the intention to reach a terminal on the Hudson River, in 1873 the NJM built the Hudson Connecting ROW south to West End Junction

The southernmost part leased from the Erie Railroad's as their original terminus, which had been built as the Paterson and Hudson River Railroad. which accessed Erie's Long Dock Tunnel and Pavonia Terminal. The NJ Midland West End Junction also served as a terminus for the Montclair Railway, which later became the New York and Greenwood Lake Railway. The lease provide access south to the PRR at Marion Junction.

Middletown, Unionville and Water Gap Railroad
In 1866, public meetings were held in Middletown Westtown and Unionville, New York to discuss the viability of a railroad via these hamlets to Deckertown, Sussex County, New Jersey.  A route was surveyed from there to Middletown, but, as built, the Middletown, Unionville and Water Gap Railroad only extended from a connection with the NY&E in Middletown to Unionville, which was reached on December 6, 1867, after fourteen months of construction.  Freight cars received from the Erie made the  trip to Unionville starting January 13, 1868.  The MU&WG was built to the  broad gauge of the Erie.  The road was leased to the Erie and commenced regular operations as the Erie's "Unionville Branch" on May 15, 1868.
On January 11, 1866, the New York and Oswego Midland Railroad (NY&OM) was incorporated with the goal of linking Oswego, New York, on Lake Ontario, with the Hudson River at a point across from New York City. The NY&OM reached Middletown in 1871 and hoped to connect with three New Jersey companies to form a through route to the Port of New York and New Jersey. The link between the NY&OM and the NJM would be the MU&WG which was leased by the NY&OM effective April 1, 1872. The NY&OM soon entered bankruptcy and dropped the lease on the MU&WG which was then leased by the NJM in 1873. NYS&W and the Middletown and New Jersey Railroad use the line with shared trackage rights.

Bankruptcy and NYS&W

The NJ Midland went bankrupt and was sold to receivers in March 1875. By December 1878, a dispute broke out between various bondholders, some of whom disputed that the Hudson Connecting Railway should be included in the proceedings. On February 21, 1880, the NJ Midland, along with the Hudson Connecting Railway, was sold to Charles Parsons, who represented the bondholders of the first and second mortgages; the two railroads were combined into one.

In June 1881 the NJ Midland was consolidated with five other railroads to form the New York, Susquehanna and Western Railway with Frederic A. Potts and Garret Hobart serving as chief officers. The company expanded west into Pennsylvania along the Wilkes-Barre and Eastern Railroad.

The NYS&W later shifted its mainline to run along the ROW developed by the Lehigh and Hudson River Railway, designating the NJ Midland portion above Sparta Junction the Hanford Branch.

Stations and possible future use
Commuter service ended in 1966, but has been considered for restoration as the part of the Passaic–Bergen–Hudson Transit Project is a project by NJ Transit to possibly reintroduce passenger service on a portion of the NYSW right-of-way (ROW) in Passaic, Bergen and Hudson counties using newly built, FRA-compliant diesel multiple unit rail cars (with stations at Vreeland Avenue and Vince Lombardi Park & Ride, among others.

Existing original station buildings from the NJ Midland era can be found at Bogota, Maywood, Rochelle Park, Wortendyke, Butler, and Newfoundland among other places.

See also 

NYSW (passenger 1939-1966) map
Timeline of Jersey City area railroads
Northern Branch
North Bergen Yard
Ridgefield Park (NYCRR/NYS&W station)
Hackensack station (New York, Susquehanna and Western Railroad)

References

External links
Two Sets of Bondholders, New York Times December 16, 1878 page 8
New-Jersey Midland to be Sold, New York Times May 27, 1879 page 2
New-Jersey Midland, New York Times February 11, 1880 page 8
The New-Jersey Midland Sold, New York Times February 22, 1880 page 12

Defunct New Jersey railroads
Predecessors of the New York, Susquehanna and Western Railway
Railway companies established in 1869
Railway companies disestablished in 1880
Transportation in Hudson County, New Jersey
1869 establishments in New Jersey